The canton of Canteleu is an administrative division of the Seine-Maritime department, in northern France. It was created at the French canton reorganisation which came into effect in March 2015. Its seat is in Canteleu.

It consists of the following communes:
Canteleu 
Hautot-sur-Seine
Maromme
Sahurs
Saint-Pierre-de-Manneville
Val-de-la-Haye

References

Cantons of Seine-Maritime